Gerlach I of Isenburg-Wied was the Count of Isenburg-Wied from 1409 until 1413.

House of Isenburg
Year of birth unknown